Halotrichite, also known as feather alum, is a highly hydrated sulfate of aluminium and iron. Its chemical formula is FeAl2(SO4)4·22H2O. It forms fibrous monoclinic crystals. The crystals are water-soluble.

It is formed by the weathering and decomposition of pyrite commonly near or in volcanic vents. The locations of natural occurrences include: the Atacama Desert, Chile; Dresden in Saxony, Germany; San Juan County, Utah; Iceland and Mont Saint-Hilaire, Canada.

The name is from Latin: halotrichum for salt hair which accurately describes the precipitate/evaporite mineral.

Gallery

References

Saint-Hilaire
Mineral Atlas

Iron(II) minerals
Aluminium minerals
Sulfate minerals
Monoclinic minerals
Minerals in space group 14